Horokhiv Raion was a raion in Volyn Oblast in western Ukraine. Its administrative center was the town of Horokhiv. The raion was abolished and its territory was merged into Lutsk Raion on 18 July 2020 as part of the administrative reform of Ukraine, which reduced the number of raions of Volyn Oblast to four. The last estimate of the raion population was 

It was created on January 20, 1940 on the former Polish territories that were annexed by the Soviet Union during World War II. The raion is based on the southern portion of the Horokhow county of Volhynia Voivodeship, while the northern portion was transformed into Lokachi Raion.

Populated places

Cities
Horokhiv (Горохів) 
Berestechko (Берестечко)

Urban-type settlements
 Mar'yanikva (Мар'янівка)
Senkevychivka (Сенкевичівка)

Villages 

 Halychany (Галичани)

References

Former raions of Volyn Oblast
1940 establishments in Ukraine
Ukrainian raions abolished during the 2020 administrative reform